Jo-ane Van Dyk (born 3 October 1997) is a South African track and field athlete who competes in the javelin throw.

Achievements
All information taken from World Athletics profile.

Competition record

National titles
 South African Championships
 Javelin throw: 2018, 2021, 2022

  Championships
 Javelin throw: 2016, 2017, 2018, 2019, 2021, 2022

 South African U20 Championships
 Javelin throw: 2016

 South African Junior Championships
 Javelin throw: 2015

References

External links

1997 births
Living people
Place of birth missing (living people)
South African female javelin throwers
Athletes (track and field) at the 2014 Summer Youth Olympics
Athletes (track and field) at the 2015 African Games
African Games bronze medalists for South Africa
African Games medalists in athletics (track and field)
White South African people
Athletes (track and field) at the 2019 African Games
African Games silver medalists for South Africa
Competitors at the 2017 Summer Universiade
Competitors at the 2019 Summer Universiade
Athletes (track and field) at the 2020 Summer Olympics
Olympic athletes of South Africa
African Championships in Athletics winners
South African Athletics Championships winners